Puros Trankazos (Huge Hits) is a compilation album released by Fonovisa Records on July 16, 2011. The album includes tracks recorded by several artist from the Regional Mexican genre, such as Julión Álvarez y su Norteño Banda, Voz de Mando, Vagón Chicano, Enigma Norteño, Larry Hernandez, Los Horóscopos de Durango, Chuy Lizárraga y su Banda Tierra Sinaloense, Grupo Violento, Banda Sinaloense MS de Sergio Lizárraga, El Chapo, Fidel Rueda and Alfredo Olivas.

Upon release, the album peaked at number-one in the Billboard Top Latin Albums chart for three non-consecutive weeks. Puros Trankazos also peaked at the top of the Regional Mexican Albums chart. The first track, "Olvídame", performed by Julión Álvarez y su Norteño Banda and available exclusively to this release, reached the top five of the Latin Songs chart in the United States. A second volume to the album was released in November 2011 titled Más Trankazos.

Background and repertoire
Puros Trankazos (Huge Hits) was released by Fonovisa Records on July 16, 2011 in the United States. The compilation album includes three tracks not available on other albums, such as "Olvídame", performed by Julión Álvarez y su Norteño Banda, the underground hit "La Hummer y el Camaro" by Voz de Mando, and "Como la Gelatina" written by Espinoza Paz and performed by Vagón Chicano. Another song written by Espinoza Paz, "Dónde Estás Presumida" by Chuy Lizárraga and his Banda Tierra Sinaloense is included. The track reached the top 10 on the Billboard Latin Songs chart. Larry Hernandez, Voz de Mando and Violento, are new acts that perform narcocorridos (songs that tell the stories of drug dealers and their exploits). Hernández performs "El Ardido", a ballad of lost love, which peaked at number 3 in the Regional Mexican Airplay chart. "Gracias a Dios" by Violento peaked at number four in the Latin Songs chart and at two in the Regional Mexican chart. "No Me Dejes con Las Ganas" by Los Horóscopos de Durango, named their departure from the duranguense style and their incursion to banda, became a top ten single for the band. Fidel Rueda performs "Me Encantaría", a song that became a number-two hit on the Latin Charts in the United States. "Increíble" by Banda Sinaloense MS de Sergio Lizárraga and "No Me Digas" by El Chapo also charted in the United States. The last track on the album is "Las Vacaciones del Jefe" by Alfredo Olivas, a song about not killing people lately and taking a vacation, which was written by Olivas.

Reception and commercial performance

The week of its release, Puros Trankazos debuted at number two on the Billboard Top Latin Albums chart, behind Prince Royce's debut album. Four weeks later, the album reached the top of the chart, where it spent three non-consecutive weeks.

On the Regional Mexican Albums chart it was at the top during seven consecutive weeks. The sales of the album were aided by success of the single "Olvídame" by Julión Álvarez y Su Norteño Banda, a banda-ballad, that became a number-one hit in the Regional Mexican Songs chart and reached number three in the Latin Songs chart.

Charts

Weekly charts

Year-end charts

Track listing
This track listing adapted from the album liner notes.

See also
 2011 in Latin music
 List of number-one Billboard Latin Albums from the 2010s

References

2011 compilation albums
Banda (music) compilation albums
Fonovisa Records compilation albums
Spanish-language compilation albums